The 1998 South Carolina Gamecocks football team represented the University of South Carolina in the Southeastern Conference (SEC) during the 1998 NCAA Division I-A football season.  The Gamecocks were led by head coach Brad Scott and played their home games in Williams-Brice Stadium in Columbia, South Carolina. Scott was fired following the end of the season, but was quickly hired as an assistant coach by Clemson. Lou Holtz was subsequently hired as South Carolina's new head coach.

Schedule

Coaching staff
Brad Scott – Head Coach
 – Offensive Coordinator/Quarterbacks
Wally Burnham – Defensive Coordinator
 – Assistant Head Coach/Offensive Line
 – Recruiting Coordinator/Linebackers
 – Running Backs
 – Tight Ends
 – Defensive Line
 – Wide Receivers
 – Outside Linebackers
 – Defensive Backs
 – Defensive Video Graduate Assistant
 – Defensive Graduate Assistant
 – Offensive Graduate Assistant
 – Offensive Video Graduate Assistant

References

South Carolina
South Carolina Gamecocks football seasons
South Carolina Gamecocks football